Harrison School District can refer to:
 Harrison Central School District (Harrison, New York)
 Harrison Public Schools (Harrison, New Jersey)
 Harrison School District (Harrison, Arkansas)
 Harrison School District 2 (Colorado Springs, Colorado)
 Harrison School District 36 (Wonder Lake, Illinois)